Dejémonos de vainas is a Colombian sitcom, created by Daniel Samper Pizano and broadcast weekly between 1983 and 1998. Bernardo Romero Pereiro scripted and directed some episodes.

The show, which depicted a "typical" middle-class family in Bogotá, was loosely based on Samper Pizano's own life. The protagonist, Juan Ramón Vargas, is a sports journalist working for El Clima (a spoof of El Tiempo), and lives with his wife, Renata, and his three children.

Main characters
Juan Ramón Vargas Sampedro (Víctor Hugo Morant, Carlos de la Fuente), father
Renata Hermelinda Villegas de Vargas (Paula Peña), mother
Ramiro,  El Costeño (Edgar Palacio), neighbor
Loly Vargas (Erika Krum), aunt 
Margarita Vargas (Marisol Correa), daughter
Teresita Vargas, a.k.a. Pecas (Claudia Anderson), daughter
Ramoncito Vargas Benjamín Herrera, son
Josefa Chivatá (Maru Yamayusa), maid

Secondary characters
Federico (Javier Locumi), Margarita's boyfriend
John Millhouse Clemens, a.k.a. El Gringo (Jimmy Bernal), Teresita's boyfriend

Spin-offs
After Teresita got married with John Millhouse Clemens (Jimmy Bernal), RCN TV produced the spin-off series Te quiero, Pecas, broadcast between 18 August 1988 and 25 March 1994.

Soundtrack
The theme song for Dejémonos de vainas was Rose Royce's Yo Yo.

References

External links
 
 
 Blog devoted to the series 

Colombian television sitcoms
1983 Colombian television series debuts
1998 Colombian television series endings
1980s Colombian television series
1990s Colombian television series
Colombian telenovelas